Rav Abba ben Rav Ammi ben Samuel  (Hebrew: רב אבא בר אמי בן שמואל ;  - 872) was the Gaon of Pumbedita from 869 until his death in 872.

Biography 
Born in about 799 to an affluent family. His grandfather, Rav Samuel ben Mar Mari was the Sura Gaon from 730-748 and a descendant of the Exilarchs. He studied under the previous Gaon, Mattithiah ha-Kohen, who appointed Rav Abba as his successor in 869. Rav Abba served as the Pumbedita Gaon for two years and was succeeded by Zemah ben Paltoi.

References 

9th-century rabbis
Rabbis of Academy of Pumbedita
Geonim